Government College of Commerce & Economics, founded as the Basant Singh Asumal College of Commerce & Economics, is an institution of commerce education in the city of Karachi. It is located on Dr. Ziauddin Ahmed Road, opposite Bagh-e-Jinnah (Polo Ground) and Pearl Continental Hotel, Karachi.

History
The college was established on 22 June 1945 under the name of Basant Singh Asumal College of Commerce & Economics, and was inaugurated by Rao Bahadur Seth Shivrattan G. Mohatta. The college was taken under the supervision of the Government of Sindh in 1948 after the establishment of Pakistan. The current building of the college was constructed in 1967. It was a co-educational institution till 1993 but then separated into two sections for girls and boys.

Courses
Government College of Commerce & Economics is offering following courses:

 Intermediate of Commerce (I. Com)
 Bachelor of Commerce (B.Com)
 B.S Commerce 4 years semester system
 B.S Business Administration 4 years semester system

List of Principals

See also
 Board of Intermediate Education Karachi
 University of Karachi

References

External links
 Official website
 Official facebook page

Universities and colleges in Karachi
Public universities and colleges in Sindh
Educational institutions established in 1945
Commerce schools
1945 establishments in India